Lucia Nevai is an American novelist and short story writer, native to Des Moines, Iowa, born September 11, 1945.  She currently resides in upstate New York. Her novel Salvation was published in 2008 by Tin House Books.   Nevai's debut novel, "Seriously," was published in 2004 by Little, Brown.  Her short stories have appeared in Tin House, Iowa Review, Zoetrope All-Story, the New Yorker, Glimmer Train, and other literary magazines. Her first collection, Star Game, won the Iowa Short Fiction Award. Her second collection, Normal, was published by Algonquin Books of Chapel Hill.

Bibliography 

2008 Salvation (novel) Portland, OR: Tin House Books.

External links 
 Salvation at Tin House Books
 Excerpt of Salvation
 Reviews of Salvation
Q & A with Lucia Nevai

21st-century American novelists
American women novelists
American women short story writers
1945 births
Living people
Writers from Des Moines, Iowa
21st-century American women writers
21st-century American short story writers
Novelists from Iowa